German submarine U-1108 was a Type VIIC/41 U-boat of Nazi Germany's Kriegsmarine during World War II.

She was ordered on 2 April 1942, and was laid down on 20 September 1943, at Nordseewerke, Emden, as yard number 230. She was launched on 5 September 1944, and commissioned under the command of Oberleutnant zur See Wolf Wigand on 18 November 1944.

Design
German Type VIIC/41 submarines were preceded by the heavier Type VIIC submarines. U-1108 had a displacement of  when at the surface and  while submerged. She had two shafts and two  propellers.

U-1108 was fitted with five  torpedo tubes (four fitted at the bow and one at the stern), fourteen torpedoes or 26 TMA or TMB Naval mines, one  SK C/35 naval gun, (220 rounds), one  Flak M42 and two  C/30 anti-aircraft guns. The boat had a complement of between forty-four and fifty-two.

Service history
On 9 May 1945, U-1108 surrendered at Horten, Norway, before participating in any war patrols. She was later transferred to Lisahally on 27 May 1945. U-1108 would be spared, for a time, becoming a British N-class submarine, used for testing and then in May 1949, broken up at Briton Ferry, Wales.

See also
 Battle of the Atlantic

References

Bibliography

German Type VIIC/41 submarines
U-boats commissioned in 1944
World War II submarines of Germany
1944 ships
Ships built in Emden